Bettenbach is a small river in Hesse, Germany. It flows into the Aar near Aarbergen.

See also
List of rivers of Hesse

Rivers of Hesse
Rivers of Germany